The Nokia 2610, released in Q1 2006, is a mobile phone manufactured by Nokia.

Design 
The Nokia 2610 is a candybar-style telephone that weighs 91 grams, with its buttons operated by the thumb. It has a  CSTN colour screen with 65,536-colour display. It uses a D-pad and two selection buttons, one on each side, with Send and End keys similar to native S40 devices. The End key also is used to turn the telephone on and off.

Specifications

Networks
 GSM 900, GSM 1800
 GSM 850, GSM 1900 (North America)

Entertainment
 Java games
 Preinstalled Coin Flipping & Nature Park games

Internet
 XHTML browser, WAP 2.0
 E-mail (POP3, IMAP4 and SMTP), with Push e-mail available for IMAP4

Connectivity
 GPRS

Storage
3 MB Internal Flash memory

Dimensions
 104 x 43 x 18 mm

Operating system
 Nokia OS, S40 user interface

Display
 1.5 in CSTN
 65,536 colours

Battery
 Li-ion, model BL-5C, 970–1020 mAh

References

External links 
 Nokia 2610 Instruction Manual (37 pgs - 839KB .pdf)

Mobile phones introduced in 2006
2610